Events in the year 1963 in Brazil.

Incumbents

Federal government
 President: João Goulart 
 Prime Minister: Hermes Lima (until 23 January)
 Vice President: vacant

Governors 
 Acre: vacant
 Alagoas: Luis Cavalcante 
 Amazonas: Gilberto Mestrinho (till 25 March); Plínio Ramos Coelho (from 25 March)
 Bahia:	Juracy Magalhães then Lomanto Junior
 Ceará: Parsifal Barroso (till 25 March); Virgílio Távora (from 25 March)
 Espírito Santo: Asdrúbal Martins Soares (till 31 January); Francisco Lacerda de Aguiar (from 31 January)
 Goiás: Mauro Borges 
 Guanabara: Carlos Lacerda
 Maranhão: Newton de Barros Belo 
 Mato Grosso: Fernando Corrêa da Costa 
 Minas Gerais: José de Magalhães Pinto  
 Pará: Aurélio do Carmo 
 Paraíba: Pedro Gondim 
 Paraná: Nei Braga 
 Pernambuco: Cid Sampaio (till 31 January); Miguel Arraes (from 31 January)
 Piauí: Tibério Nunes (till 25 March); Petrônio Portella (from 25 March)
 Rio de Janeiro: 
 until 18 January: José Janotti                             
 18 January-31 January: Luís Miguel Pinaud 
 from 31 January: Badger da Silveira                                              
 Rio Grande do Norte: Aluízio Alves 
 Rio Grande do Sul: Leonel Brizola (till 25 March); Ildo Meneghetti (from 25 March)
 Santa Catarina: Celso Ramos 
 São Paulo: Carlos Alberto Alves de Carvalho Pinto (till 31 January); Ademar de Barros (from 31 January)
 Sergipe: 
 until 30 January: Dionísio Machado                             
 30 January-31 January: Horácio Dantas de Goes 
 from 31 January: João de Seixas Dória

Vice governors
 Alagoas: Teotônio Brandão Vilela 
 Bahia: Orlando Moscoso 
 Ceará: Wilson Gonçalves (until 31 January); Joaquim de Figueiredo Correia (from 25 March)
 Espírito Santo: Rubens Rangel (from 31 January)
 Goiás: Antônio Rezende Monteiro (until 31 January); vacant thereafter (from 31 January)
 Maranhão: Alfredo Salim Duailibe 
 Mato Grosso: Jose Garcia Neto 
 Minas Gerais: Clóvis Salgado da Gama 
 Pará: Newton Burlamaqui de Miranda 
 Paraíba: André Avelino de Paiva Gadelha 
 Pernambuco: Paulo Pessoa Guerra 
 Piauí: João Clímaco d'Almeida 
 Rio de Janeiro: João Batista da Costa (from 31 January)
 Rio Grande do Norte: Teodorico Bezerra (from 19 January)
 Santa Catarina: Armindo Marcílio Doutel de Andrade
 São Paulo: Porfírio da Paz (until 31 January); Laudo Natel (from 31 January)
 Sergipe: Celso Carvalho (from 31 January)

Events 

December 4: Homicide at the Brazilian Senate.

Births
November 2 – Valdemiro Santiago, evangelical pastor

Deaths 
November 4 – Carlos Magalhães de Azeredo, poet and writer (b. 1872)

References

See also 
1963 in Brazilian football
1963 in Brazilian television

 
1960s in Brazil
Years of the 20th century in Brazil
Brazil
Brazil